The Ezo chipmunk is a subspecies or local population of the Siberian chipmunk; it is found in what was once known as Ezo, namely Hokkaidō, Japan, and Sakhalin and the Southern Kuriles, Russia.

Taxonomy
The Ezo chipmunk was first described by Philipp Franz von Siebold in 1824, shortly after his arrival in Japan: "Myoxus lineatus, its back marked and distinguished with five stripes, verging on black, that run the length of its body, lives on the island of Ezo; body 6½ inches, tail 4½ inches." As such, the type specimens are credited by Oldfield Thomas in his series of papers on the Duke of Bedford's "zoological exploration" of east Asia as "representing the first mammal ever described from Japan".

Thomas transferred the taxon from the Linnaean genus Myoxus to Tamias and cited a need for comparison with "more Siberian material" to determine its specific or subspecific status. Subsequently recognized as a subspecies of the Siberian chipmunk Tamias sibiricus, first described (as Sciurus sibiricus) by explorer Erich Gustav Laxmann in 1769, Tamias (Eutamias) sibiricus lineatus is included in Mammal Species of the World as one of nine subspecies of Tamias (Eutamias) sibiricus. The same nine subspecies are listed in the 2016 Handbook of the Mammals of the World, but in the ensuing 2020 Illustrated Checklist of the Mammals of the World, the former subgenus Eutamias is promoted to the genus Eutamias, with one extant species (the Siberian chipmunk), and only three subspecies recognized (E. s. sibiricus, E. s. barberi, and E. s. senescens), the Ezo chipmunk as subspecies synonymized into E. s. sibiricus. This treatment is largely based on genetics, though morphological characteristics also helped drive the promotion to generic status of Eutamias Trouessart, 1880 and Neotamias, Howell, 1929, alongside Tamias Illiger, 1811, within the tribe Marmotini.

Vernacular names
In Japanese the Ezo chipmunk is called , and, in the Ainu language, .

Distribution

According to the explanatory materials accompanying the 2010 Ministry of the Environment Red List, Tamias sibiricus lineatus is found on Hokkaidō and the neighbouring islands of Rebun, Rishiri, Teuri, and Yagishiri, as well as on Sakhalin, Etorofu, and Kunashiri; however, it is noted that a full distribution survey has not been conducted on Hokkaidō itself and that due to the unknown consequences of the introduction of continental conspecifics (especially T. s. barberi, as pets—as well as those intentionally released in Hokkaido University Botanical Gardens) in terms of competition and crossbreeding with the native subspecies, the population and precise distribution of the Ezo chipmunk is unknown; as such, the conservation status of Tamias sibiricus lineatus on the 2020 Japanese Red List is Data Deficient.

Physical description

Tamias sibiricus lineatus measures  from the tip of its nose to the base of its tail, which extends a further , and weighs . Its fur is a pale brown, with five blackish stripes running the length of its back, with white in the gaps between and on its underparts. Compared with other Siberian chipmunks, where the nominate subspecies T. s. sibiricus is "darker and less brightly coloured",  and T. s. orientalis (found in Korea, northwest China and adjoining areas of Siberia) "brighter and ruddier", T. s. lineatus is "more pale on hips and top of head" than T. s. orientalis.

Behaviour and ecology

Habitat
The Ezo chipmunk inhabits forested areas from the plains to high mountains (up to an altitude of c. ). Though spending much of its time at ground level, it is also proficient at climbing trees, using its tail for balance. In coastal areas, the constituents of its diet may be markedly different from that of Ezo chipmunks in the highland zone of Daisetsuzan.

Diet and predation

Omnivorous, the diet of the Ezo chipmunk includes the seeds, fruit, flowers, shoots, leaves, and sap of over thirty-five species of trees and grasses, insects, snails, and the eggs of small birds; in particular, changing with the seasons, in early spring, sasa shoots and young maple leaves, and as these grow and become tougher, the seeds, cones, and nuts of sedge, Japanese stone pine, and Japanese rowan, various types of cherry, as well as Mongolian oak acorns. However, this diet is supplemented, particularly while young chipmunks are being reared, with spiders, cicadas, snails, stag beetles, ant pupae, moth larvae, Japanese tit eggs, sometimes even young chicks of the long-tailed tit. This chipmunk does not eat mushrooms. 

In turn, the Ezo chipmunk is preyed upon by the Ezo red fox, Japanese weasel, least weasel, Japanese striped snake, owls, and other birds of prey. Since any buried acorns it does not retrieve and eat themselves may start to grow in the following spring, the Ezo chipmunk also plays a role in forest regeneration.

Hibernation
The Ezo chipmunk spends five to seven months each year in isolation and the dark, in hibernation in its underground nest in the middle of the forest; adult females average 211 days in hibernation, adult males 180 days, young females 194 days, and young males 169 days. Both males and females move to a new burrow each year, though with an array of available old burrows, they may decide to renovate and occupy one of these, females relocating on average  and males .

When finally entering its burrow, it blocks up the entrance with earth from inside. While hibernating, the pulse and respiratory pulse rate slows (the latter by 50%–75%), and body temperature drops (to some ), increasing again every ten days for a short spell of activity when it briefly awakens, eats, and visits its toilet area. In years of early thaw, hibernation similarly ends early. The success of Ezo chipmunk hibernation is attested to by the relatively low mortality rate, below 5%.

Reproduction
(The range of a male may overlap with that of four to ten females.) The female typically goes into estrous three days after her finally awakening from hibernation. After an intense single day of mating, in late April or early May, the female calling "koro-koro" to attract nearby males ("po po po" sounds may also be observed at this time), and a 30-day gestation period, some three to seven young are born, in approximately half of instances, the female choosing the same burrow for parturition as she previously used for hibernation. With young being nursed for a further sixty days, there is only the opportunity for one litter each year. At this stage, the mother returns to the burrow three to five times a day for feeding (with milk), such visits lasting on average one-and-a-half hours; she also stays the night with her young. Some four weeks after birth, their eyes open, at which point they begin to explore their tunnel, sometimes also poking their heads out of the entrance. A week or so later, they venture out for the first time, accompanied by their mother, and from this point she moves to a different burrow at night, still visiting that of her young some four to eight times a day for feeding, with milk and other foodstuffs. After some sixty days she stops visiting, leaving her young to fend for themselves; by this time, it is August.

Lifespan
In captivity, the Ezo chipmunk can live for up to nine years, while in the wild the upper limit is typically five for males and six for females. However, around half of all males and females perish each year going about their daily activities between spring and autumn.

See also

 List of mammals in Japan
 Japanese Red List
 Adam Laxman (son of Erich Laxmann)

Notes

References

External links
 Invasive Species of Japan: Tamias sibiricus subspp. (National Institute for Environmental Studies)

Chipmunks
Mammals of Japan
Mammals described in 1824
Hokkaido